Kenny Charles Edward Habul (born 24 May 1973) is an Australian professional race car driver and businessman. Born in Sydney, Australia, a former resident of Etobicoke, Ontario, Greenwich, CT, and a current resident of Mooresville, North Carolina, he is the president and CEO of SunEnergy1. He has competed in the IMSA WeatherTech SportsCar Championship, the V8 Supercar Development Series, the Australian Formula 3 Championship, the CASCAR Super Series, and the NASCAR Xfinity Series. In 2018 he won the inaugural Intercontinental GT Challenge Bronze Drivers' title. He won the 2022 Bathurst 12 Hour with his SunEnergy1 Racing team.

Racing career

Introduction 
Habul started his racing career in karting at the age of six. His following career included racing in Formula Ford, Formula 3, V8 Supercars, CASCAR, NASCAR Trucks, NASCAR Xfinity Series and the IMSA WeatherTech SportsCar Championship. He also competed in the 2018 Bathurst 12-hour where he finished second outright. That race was the first in four endurance events for the year that made up the Intercontinental GT Challenge. After Bathurst he headed to the 24 Hours of Spa-Francorchamps where he claimed another podium in the Bronze Driver class, before sealing a second Bronze driver win at the Suzuka 10 Hours in Japan in August. Habul wrapped up the inaugural Bronze driver title at the final round at Laguna Seca in California in October.

Formula Ford 
In 1998, after spending several years establishing his business career, Habul returned to racing in the Australian Formula Ford championship. The following year Habul scored his first category podium in a qualifying sprint support race at the Gold Coast Indy 300 on the streets of Surfers Paradise in Queensland. He finished third behind 2014 IndyCar Champion and 2018 Indy 500 winner, Will Power and Bathurst 1000 podium-getter, Steve Owen.

Formula 3 
In 2002, Habul moved to Formula 3 and competed in support races at the Gold Coast Indy 300. The following season Habul contested most of the championship rounds, finishing ninth outright in the national championship.

CASCAR 
After moving to Ontario, Habul began racing stock cars, competing in the CASCAR Super Series.  In 2005, Habul contested three rounds of the series recording a best result of 10th. Before the series was purchased by NASCAR in 2007, Habul recorded a career best of third.

Xfinity Series

After making six starts in the Nationwide Series in 2012 and 2013, in June 2014 Habul announced that he had signed with Joe Gibbs Racing to drive a SunEnergy1-sponsored car in the series' events at Road America and the Mid-Ohio Sports Car Course that year.

Habul joined JR Motorsports in 2016 to compete in the road course races. Additionally, SunEnergy1 sponsored him and Josh Berry in the No. 88 Chevrolet Camaro, while also sponsoring Chase Elliott in the Sprint Cup Series.

Camping World Truck Series
On 6 April 2013, Habul made his Camping World Truck Series debut with RSS Racing, driving the No. 93 Chevrolet Silverado at Martinsville.

WeatherTech SportsCar Championship
In 2016, Habul started his own team in the IMSA WeatherTech SportsCar Championship. Driving in the GTD series, Habul started 2017 by winning the pole in his class for the 12 Hours of Sebring.

In 2018, Kabul continued his IMSA campaign by competing in the Rolex 24hr Daytona in January, finishing 8th. For the Belle Isle race, Habul teamed up with Bernd Schneider. The pair finished the weekend in 8th.

Intercontinental GT Challenge 

In 2018 Habul entered the Intercontinental GT Challenge in the Bronze category, starting the season at the Liqui Moly Bathurst 12 Hour in February, where he finished on the podium with co-drivers Jamie Whincup, Vautier, and Raffaele Marciello. At the 24 Hours of Spa he finished 20th overall and 3rd in the Pro-Am class with co-drivers Bernd Schneider, Thomas Jaeger, and Martin Konrad. He then won his class in the Suzuka 10 Hours, finishing 10th overall with co-drivers Mikaël Grenier and Luca Stolz for the 10 hour race; the same co-drivers joined Habul for the season finale 8-hour event at Laguna Seca Raceway, where after spending two hours repairing damage in the pits Habul clinched the Bronze Driver Championship title with a 27th place overall finish, fourth in class In 2022, Habul won the 2022 Bathurst 12 Hour, driving with Konrad, Stolz and Jules Gounon.

Personal life and awards 
Habul attended Merrimac High School, and then received a law degree from Bond University.

In 2011, North Carolina State House Representative Ruth Samuelson awarded Habul with recognition on behalf of the NC Solar Center. He was also presented with the Energy Leadership Award in 2012 by the Charlotte Business Journal. On 18 December 2010, Habul was commissioned a Palmetto Patriot by the Lieutenant Governor of South Carolina, Andre Bauer. At the same ceremony Darlington Raceway President Chris Browning and NASCAR Legends David Parsons, Bud Moore, Cale Yarborough and Cotton Owners, all South Carolina natives, were also honoured.

Music 
Habul is credited as a co-composer, along with Zac Brown, Niko Moon and Ben Simonetti for the song Your Majesty, which appears as the eighth track on the Zac Brown Band's 2017 album, Welcome Home.

Philanthropy 
Habul and SunEnergy1 started a relationship with the Feed the Children in 2015 in a drive to provide 1,000 Elizabeth City-area families with food and essentials through the Albemarle Food Pantry.

Images

Motorsports career results

NASCAR
(key) (Bold – Pole position awarded by qualifying time. Italics – Pole position earned by points standings or practice time. * – Most laps led.)

Xfinity Series

Camping World Truck Series 

 Season still in progress
 Ineligible for series points

Complete WeatherTech SportsCar Championship results
(key) (Races in bold indicate pole position) (Races in italics indicate fastest lap)

*Season still in progress.

Complete Bathurst 12 Hour results

Complete Blancpain GT Series Sprint Cup results

Complete Intercontinental GT Challenge results

References

External links
 

Living people
1973 births
Sportspeople from Etobicoke
Racing drivers from Queensland
NASCAR drivers
Supercars Championship drivers
Australian Formula 3 Championship drivers
24 Hours of Daytona drivers
WeatherTech SportsCar Championship drivers
Joe Gibbs Racing drivers
Blancpain Endurance Series drivers
Mercedes-AMG Motorsport drivers
JR Motorsports drivers
24H Series drivers